Çukurelma can refer to:

 Çukurelma, Çermik
 Çukurelma, Elmalı